Richard Kerbaj is a BAFTA-winning, twice Emmy-nominated filmmaker, writer and multi-award winning print journalist. Kerbaj specialized in investigating crime and national security-related stories during his 20 year career at newspapers in Australia and Britain.

Kerbaj's most recent projects include the book The Secret History of the Five Eyes: The untold story of the international spy network in 2022, and Litvinenko in 2022, a true-crime TV drama centred on the 2006 assassination of Alexander Litvinenko by Russian agents operating in London.

Life
Born in Melbourne, Australia to parents of Druze origin, Kerbaj's family moved to a village in Lebanon in 1980 when he was 2 years old. They became trapped by the country's escalating civil war.

His family returned to Melbourne and lived in Toorak where they ran a milk bar. During Kerbaj's final year of high school his English grades improved dramatically with help from tutor and friend Ben Sheehan. In March 2001, Kerbaj started a writing course at Deakin University, where he studied under influential Australian author, journalist and photographer Peter Davis. Kerbaj's first newspaper article was an August 2001 profile of host of Barry Bissell, the host of radio show Take 40 Australia, which was published in The Age.

Kerbaj initially worked as a freelancer before he started working for The Australian newspaper in 2005.

In 2006 Kerbaj published an article on Sheikh Taj Din al-Hilali which won the John Curtin Prize for Journalism and a Young Journalist of the Year award at News Limited which gave him the opportunity to work at a News Limited publication in London for three months.

In 2018 Kerbaj shared the "Scoop of the Year" award with Tom Harper and Jon Ungoed-Thomas at the British Press Awards for their reporting on pornography found on the computer of Damian Green.

In December, Kerbaj praised the series' star David Tennant, stating that he had: "Saved our show because it was commissioned a few months before COVID hit. Had David decided not to stay involved, I’m not sure the drama would've been made."

Producer
 My Son the Jihadi, a BAFTA winning documentary about the mother of Thomas Evans, an Al Shabaab militant who was killed in 2015.
 Hunting the KGB Killers, a documentary about the poisoning of Alexander Litvinenko.

Books

References

External links
 Profile at The Times UK

21st-century Australian journalists
BAFTA winners (people)
21st-century Australian writers
The Press Awards
1970s births
Living people